Westfield is an English surname. Notable people with the surname include:

Bob Westfield (1907–1970), New Zealand-born Australian rugby union player
Ernest Westfield (1939–2020), American baseball player
Mervyn Westfield (born 1988), English cricketer
Robert Westfield (born 1972), American writer
Thomas Westfield (1573–1644), Bishop of Bristol, member of the Westminster Assembly

Fictional characters
Paul Westfield, a DC Comics character

See also
Charles Westfield Coker (born 1933), the former president and CEO of Sonoco Products Company of Hartsville, South Carolina, US

English-language surnames